Papyrus 72 (𝔓72, Papyrus Bodmer VII-VIII) is the designation used by textual critics of the New Testament to describe portions of the so-called Bodmer Miscellaneous codex, namely the letters of  Jude, 1 Peter, and 2 Peter. These books seem to have been copied by the same scribe, and the handwriting has been paleographically assigned to the 3rd or 4th century.

Although the letters of Jude (P.Bodmer VII) and 1-2 Peter (P.Bodmer VIII) in this codex do not form a single continuous text, scholars still tend to refer to these three texts as a single early New Testament papyrus.

Description
Papyrus 72 is the earliest known manuscript of these epistles, though a few verses of Jude are in a fragment 78 (P. Oxy. 2684).

P.Bodmer VII (Jude) and P.Bodmer VIII (1-2 Peter) form part of a single book (the Bodmer Miscellaneous Codex). This book appeared on the antiquities market in Egypt and was bought by the Swiss collector Martin Bodmer. The same scribe who copied P.Bodmer VII and VIII is also thought to have copied P.Bodmer X and XI.

The manuscript contains the usual nomina sacra for Messiah, Jesus, God, Lord, Spirit, Father, plus a few non-standard ones:  (power), Σα (Sarah), Αβμ (Abraham),   (Noah),  (Archangel Michael), and Εχ (Enoch).

A facsimile edition of Bodmer Papyrus VIII was published in 2007 by Testimonio Compañía Editorial.

Text

The Greek text of this codex is a representative of the Alexandrian text-type. According to Aland in 1-2 Peter it has normal text, in Jude free text, both with certain peculiarities. Aland placed it into I Category. It is close to the Codex Vaticanus and Codex Alexandrinus.

See also
 List of New Testament papyri
 Bodmer Library

Notes

References

Further reading 
 Aland, Kurt and Barbara Aland. The Text of the New Testament. 2nd ed. Grand Rapids: Eerdmans, 1995.
 Beare, FW (1961),The Text of I Peter in Papyrus 72, Journal of Biblical Literature, Vol. 80, No.3, pp. 253–260.
 Wasserman, Tommy. "Papyrus 72 and the Bodmer Miscellaneous Codex," New Testament Studies 51, (2005), 137–154.  
 Jones, Brice C. "The Bodmer 'Miscellaneous' Codex and the Crosby-Schøyen Codex MS 193: A New Proposal." JGRChJ (2011-2012), 9-20. 
 Nongbri, Brent. "The Construction of P.Bodmer VIII and the Bodmer 'Composite' or 'Miscellaneous' Codex." Novum Testamentum 58 (2016), 394–410.  
 Kubo, Sakae. 𝔓72 and the Codex Vaticanus. Studies and Documents 27. Salt Lake City: University of Utah Press, 1965.
 Strickland, Phillip David. 2017. "The Curious Case of 𝔓72: What an Ancient Manuscript Can Tell us about the Epistles of Peter and Jude." Journal of the Evangelical Society 60.4:781-792.
 Images available for viewing at CSNTM, 𝔓72 and the Vatican's website. https://digi.vatlib.it/view/MSS_Pap.Bodmer.VIII

New Testament papyri
3rd-century biblical manuscripts
Early Greek manuscripts of the New Testament
Manuscripts of the Vatican Library
Epistle of Jude papyri
First Epistle of Peter papyri
Second Epistle of Peter papyri